Celebrations is a miniature chocolate bar collection made by Mars, Incorporated, launched in 1997. It comprises miniature versions of full size Mars brands. Celebrations have the tagline "Share the joy", and were one of the first mixed box of chocolates in the United Kingdom to bring together confectionery which had been already released in one box or tin instead of introducing new, especially-created confectionery made exclusively for the UK market, by a major producer.
Celebrations boxes are now sold in multiple countries which tend to have the same brands as the UK (Galaxy goes under Dove in most countries), but do differ in some circumstances. Twix does not come in Australian celebrations for example.

Contents

 Maltesers Teaser
 Mars 
 Milky Way
 Snickers 
 Galaxy/Dove
 Galaxy Caramel
 Twix (1997–2006, 2011–) 
 Bounty
The selection sold in the United Kingdom also previously had:

 Galaxy Truffle (1997–2011)
 Topic (1997–2006)

In some countries, the Milky Way Bar has been replaced, or is under limited edition. In these countries, it is usually replaced with Milky Way crispy rolls, which was introduced in 2017.

In the United States version, Milky Way and Dove were replaced with the American versions, and Maltesers Teasers is not a part of the selection.

On 3 November 2022 it was announced that Bounty bars would be removed from some labeled tubs in the UK after the manufacturers found that 40% of people hated them. A limited run of "No Bounty" tubs would be available, at 40 Tesco stores, in the weeks before Christmas. But a final decision had not been made after 18% of people named the Bounty as their favourite.

Rival products 
Cadbury Roses
 Cadbury Favourites or Heroes
Nestlé Quality Street

References

External links
Celebrations UK site

Chocolate bars
Mars confectionery brands
Products introduced in 1997